Erika Pollmann (born 15 February 1944) is a German sprinter. She competed in the women's 100 metres at the 1964 Summer Olympics.

References

1944 births
Living people
Athletes (track and field) at the 1964 Summer Olympics
German female sprinters
Olympic athletes of the United Team of Germany
Place of birth missing (living people)
Olympic female sprinters